The 1981 Skate America was held in Lake Placid, New York. Medals were awarded in the disciplines of men's singles, ladies' singles, pair skating, and ice dancing.

Results

Men

Ladies

Pairs

Ice dancing

External links
 Skate Canada results

Skate America, 1981
Skate America